Laura Wolvaardt (born 26 April 1999) is a South African cricketer who currently plays for Western Province, Adelaide Strikers, Gujarat Giants and South Africa. She plays as a right-handed opening batter. She has previously played for Northern Superchargers and Brisbane Heat.

Career

Domestic
Aged 13, Wolvaardt was selected to play for the Western Province U-19 girls' team. In October 2013, she made her first appearance for the Western Province senior team in a Twenty20 match against Boland women, scoring 13 runs from 18 balls. She made her limited overs cricket debut for Western Province in a November 2013 match against Boland, scoring 4 from 14 balls. She was the top scorer in the 2013 Cricket South Africa Under 19 Girls Week, and competed again in 2014 representing Western Province. Wolvaardt scored 46 in Western Province's final match of the 2015/16 Women's Provincial League, as they won the title for the fourth consecutive year.

In November 2017, she was named in Brisbane Heat's squad for the 2017–18 Women's Big Bash League season. In November 2018, she was named in Brisbane Heat's squad for the 2018–19 Women's Big Bash League season. She played for the Heat in their final against Sydney Sixers. Heat won the match to win the title.

Laura continued her appearances in the WBBL after signing with the Adelaide Strikers for the 2020–21 and 2021–22 Australian summer seasons.

In September 2019, she was named in the Terblanche XI squad for the inaugural edition of the Women's T20 Super League in South Africa. In 2021, she was drafted by Northern Superchargers for the inaugural season of The Hundred. In April 2022, she was bought by the Northern Superchargers for the 2022 season of The Hundred.

In March 2023, Woolvaardt was added to the Gujarat Giants squad as a mid-season replacement for Beth Mooney in the 2023 Women's Premier League.

International
In December 2013, 13-year-old Wolvaardt was invited to play for a South Africa Women's U-19 invitational team. She was later named the 2013 Cricket South Africa under-19 female cricketer of the year. Wolvaardt has captained the South Africa Women's U-19 side, and in February 2016, she made her Women's One Day International debut in the opening match of a three-match series against England aged 16. In the second match of the series, she scored her maiden half century in a 114-run partnership with Trisha Chetty. She also played in a match against West Indies, and scored 10 in an opening partnership of 33 runs.

In August 2016, Wolvaardt became the youngest centurion, male or female, for South Africa in international cricket. As a 17-year-old, the opener struck a match-winning 105 against Ireland Women to wrap up a 67-run victory in Malahide, Ireland.

In May 2017, she was named Women's Newcomer of the Year at Cricket South Africa's annual awards. In March 2018, she was one of fourteen players to be awarded a national contract by Cricket South Africa ahead of the 2018–19 season. In October 2018, she was named in South Africa's squad for the 2018 ICC Women's World Twenty20 tournament in the West Indies. Ahead of the tournament, she was named as the player to watch in the team. In January 2020, she was named in South Africa's squad for the 2020 ICC Women's T20 World Cup in Australia. On 23 July 2020, Wolvaardt was named in South Africa's 24-woman squad to begin training in Pretoria, ahead of their planned tour to England.

In February 2022, she was named in South Africa's team for the 2022 Women's Cricket World Cup in New Zealand.

In May 2022, she played seven matches for the Barmy Army team at the 2022 FairBreak Invitational T20 in Dubai, United Arab Emirates.  During the Invitational, she scored a total of 186 runs at a strike rate of 116.25, including two fifties.

In June 2022, Wolvaardt was named in South Africa's Women's Test squad for their one-off match against England Women. She made her Test debut on 27 June 2022, for South Africa against England. In July 2022, she was named in South Africa's team for the cricket tournament at the 2022 Commonwealth Games in Birmingham, England.

One Day International centuries

Honours
In July 2020, she was named South Africa's Women's Cricketer of the Year at Cricket South Africa's annual awards ceremony. At the 2021 ICC Awards, she was named in the ICC Women's T20I Team of the Year.

Personal life
Wolvaardt graduated from Parklands College in 2017 with 7 Distinctions, ranking top in her class. Simultaneously she served as Head-Prefect alongside the other Head-Prefect, Connor Fick.

See also 
 List of centuries in women's One Day International cricket

References

External links

 
 
 
 The Final Word Podcast: Interview of Laura Wolvaardt (21 July 2022) – on Apple Podcasts, on Google Podcasts, on Spotify and on YouTube

1999 births
Living people
South African women cricketers
South Africa women Test cricketers
South Africa women One Day International cricketers
South Africa women Twenty20 International cricketers
Western Province women cricketers
Adelaide Strikers (WBBL) cricketers
Brisbane Heat (WBBL) cricketers
Northern Superchargers cricketers
IPL Velocity cricketers
Gujarat Giants (WPL) cricketers
Cricketers from the Western Cape
Cricketers at the 2022 Commonwealth Games
Commonwealth Games competitors for South Africa